Ancistrus heterorhynchus is a species of catfish in the family Loricariidae. It is native to South America, where it occurs in the Inambari River basin, which is part of the Madre de Dios River drainage in Peru. The species reaches 6.3 cm (2.5 inches) SL and is known to inhabit high-altitude areas.

References 

heterorhynchus
Catfish of South America
Fish described in 1912